Wastewater surveillance is the process of monitoring wastewater for contaminants. Amongst other uses, it can be used for biosurveillance, to detect the presence of pathogens in local populations, and to detect the presence of psychoactive drugs.

One example of this is the use of wastewater monitoring to detect the presence of the SARS-CoV-2 virus in populations during the COVID-19 pandemic. In one study, wastewater surveillance showed signs of SARS-CoV-2 RNA before any cases were detected in the local population. 

Later in the pandemic, wastewater surveillance was demonstrated to be one technique to detect SARS-CoV-2 variants and to monitor their spread in regions for studying related ongoing infection dynamics. Comparison between case based epidemiological records and deep-sequenced wastewater samples validated that the composition of the virus population in the wastewater is in strong agreement with the virus variants circulating in the infected population. Following the 2022-23 reopening surge of COVID-19 cases in China, airplane wastewater surveillance began to be employed as a less intrusive method of monitoring for potential variants of concern arising within specific countries and regions.

At the request of the US Centers for Disease Control, the National Academies of Sciences, Engineering, and Medicine revealed, in a January 2023 report, its vision for a national wastewater surveillance system. Such a system would, according to the report committee, remove geographical inequities in the identification of future SARS-CoV-2 variants, influenza strains, antibiotic resistant bacteria, and other potential threats. Nationwide wastewater surveillance would likewise be combined with wastewater collection at other early-warning "sentinel sites," such as zoos and international airports.

See also 
 Wastewater-based epidemiology

References 

Epidemiology
Sewerage
Surveillance